Rayegan-e Olya (also Romanized as Rāyegān-e ‘Olyā; also known as Rāyegān-e Bālā, Rāykān-e Bālā, Rāykān-e ‘Olyā, and Rikān Bāla) is a village in Mohajeran Rural District, Lalejin District, Bahar County, Hamadan Province, Iran. At the 2006 census, its population was 387, in 88 families.

References 

Populated places in Bahar County